Parker Ford is an unincorporated community in East Coventry Township, Chester County, Pennsylvania, United States. Maps show it at the intersection of Pennsylvania Route 724 and Bethel Church Road/Linfield Road. Linfield Road crosses the Schuylkill River to Linfield, an unincorporated village in Limerick Township, Montgomery County.

References

Populated places on the Schuylkill River
Unincorporated communities in Chester County, Pennsylvania
Unincorporated communities in Pennsylvania